Sir Clifton Wintringham, 1st Baronet (bapt. 20 January 1710 – 9 January 1794) was an English military physician.

Life
He was the eldest son of physician Clifton Wintringham senior, and was educated at Trinity College, Cambridge. He had a distinguished medical career, being elected Fellow of the Royal Society in 1742, and becoming joint military physician to the forces, with John Pringle, in 1756. He was also physician in ordinary to George III, from 1762 when he was knighted. He was created baronet in 1774.

Joseph Robertson, a friend, edited Wintringham's De morbis quibusdam commentarii (1782), and dedicated to him An Essay on Punctuation. A memorial to Wintringham, by Thomas Banks, was erected in Westminster Abbey, marking the high standing with which he had been seen during life.

Notes

1710 births
1794 deaths
Alumni of Trinity College, Cambridge
18th-century English medical doctors
Fellows of the Royal Society
Knights Bachelor
Baronets in the Baronetage of Great Britain